Benjamin Lethieullier (1729-1797), was a British politician who sat in the House of Commons between  1768 and 1797.

Lethieullier was the son of Christopher Lethieullier, director of the Bank of England, and his wife Sarah Lascelles who was daughter of Edward Lascelles, and widow of Joshua Iremonger of Wherwell, Hampshire.

Lethieullier's father died in 1736 and in 1741 his mother Sarah purchased Swakeleys for him. He came of age in 1750 and in the following year sold the estate to the Rector of Ickenham. He  became a wealthy man, holding considerable amounts of Bank of England stock. He never had any involvement in the Bank of England although his father and uncle were both directors.  Between 1748 and 1753 he undertook the Grand Tour with his brother-in-law Sir Matthew Fetherstonhaugh, 1st Baronet, and his step brother Lascelles Iremonger. They brought back to Uppark an impressive collection of Italian art.

In 1768 Lethieullier was returned  as Member of Parliament for Andover and held the seat for 29 years. In 1784 he was returned both for Andover and Midhurst  and chose to sit again for Andover.

Lethieullier is not recorded as speaking in parliament but voted regularly on major issues. He never held any political appointments. He was spoken of with respect but is rarely mentioned in correspondence.

Lethieullier died unmarried on 5 December 1797 .

References

Sources
Portrait of Benjamin Lethieullier MP (1728/9-1797), with two Wild Boar Spears by Pompeo Girolamo Batoni at Uppark, National Trust.

1729 births
1797 deaths
British MPs 1761–1768
British MPs 1768–1774
British MPs 1774–1780
British MPs 1780–1784
British MPs 1784–1790
British MPs 1790–1796
Members of the Parliament of Great Britain for English constituencies